In mathematics, Giambelli's formula, named after Giovanni Giambelli, expresses Schubert classes in terms of special Schubert classes, or Schur functions in terms of complete symmetric functions.

It states

where σλ is the Schubert class of a partition λ.

Giambelli's formula is a consequence of Pieri's formula. The Porteous formula is a generalization to morphisms of vector bundles over a variety.

See also 

 Schubert calculus - includes examples

References

Symmetric functions